Dunfermline Townhill TMD was a traction maintenance depot located in Dunfermline, Fife, Scotland. The depot was situated on the Fife Circle Line and was near Dunfermline station. 

The depot code was DT.

History 
Prior to May 1973 the shed code was 62C. After that it was DT. In 1976, Class 06  and 08 shunters could be seen at the depot.

References 
 

 Railway depots in Scotland
Buildings and structures in Dunfermline